Cochylimorpha flaveola is a species of moth of the family Tortricidae. It is found in Kazakhstan.

References

Moths described in 1963
Cochylimorpha
Moths of Asia